Roger Schawinski (born June 11, 1945 in Zurich as Roger Szczawiński) is a Swiss journalist and entrepreneur as well as the creator of the Swiss consumer watchdog program Kassensturz (English: "cash check").

Early life 
Schawinski was born Roger Szczawiński to Polish-born immigrant father Abraham Szczawiński who had a modest textile business. He grew up in Zürich-Wiedikon. In 1946 his family was naturalized in Zurich and germanized their name to Schawinski. He initially completed commercial school instead of going directly for the Swiss maturity. He later completed studies in economics at the University of St. Gallen (HSG).

Career
He founded Switzerland's first commercial radio station, Radio 24, and launched a nationwide television channel called Tele 24. In 2003, he gained international status when he joined the German television network Sat. 1 and became the managing director for three consecutive years. He earned a PhD in economics from University of St. Gallen. Schawinski pre-launched Radio 1 on 14 January 2008 and went on air with it on 17 March 2008. Radio 1 was the first radio station especially devoted to music and the taste for adults in their 30s–60s.

References

External links
Gallery of famous Swiss people
A morning with Roger Schawinski 

1945 births
Living people
Swiss Jews
University of St. Gallen alumni